Laser dance may refer to:
Laserdance, a synthdance studio project
Laser-dance, a music featured in the film Ocean's Twelve